Meyerstown is an unincorporated community near the Shenandoah River in Jefferson County, West Virginia, United States.

Notable person
Robert Page Sims, African American academic and university president

References

Unincorporated communities in Jefferson County, West Virginia
Unincorporated communities in West Virginia